Michael Derrell Miles Jr. (born August 24, 2002) is an American college basketball player for the TCU Horned Frogs of the Big 12 Conference.

Early life and high school career
Miles grew up playing basketball for the Texas Titans on the Amateur Athletic Union (AAU) circuit alongside Cade Cunningham. When Miles was in fourth grade, his AAU highlight videos drew national attention; Yahoo Sports labeled him "the elementary school Allen Iverson." He attended Lancaster High School in Lancaster, Texas. As a junior, he averaged 18 points, 4.5 assists and 2.3 steals per game, leading his team to a 31–3 record. As a senior, Miles averaged 21.4 points, four rebounds, four assists and three steals per game, leading his team to a 36–1 record. He was named SportsDayHS All-Area Player of the Year by The Dallas Morning News, as well as Class 5A Player of the Year. Miles committed to playing college basketball for TCU over offers from LSU, Oregon and Oklahoma State, among other programs.

College career
On January 30, 2021, Miles recorded a freshman season-high 28 points and five assists in a 102–98 overtime loss to Missouri. As a freshman, he averaged 13.6 points, 3.5 rebounds and 3.1 assists per game. Miles was named to the Big 12 All-Freshman Team and earned All-Big 12 honorable mention. As a sophomore, he averaged 15.4 points, 3.8 assists and 3.5 rebounds per game. He was named to the Second Team All-Big 12 as a sophomore. On March 30, 2022, Miles declared for the 2022 NBA draft, forgoing his remaining college eligibility. However, he later clarified that he did not hire an agent and is maintaining his college eligibility. On April 11, Miles withdrew from the draft and announced he would return to TCU for his junior season. He was named to the Second Team All-Big 12 as a junior.

National team career
Miles represented the United States at the 2021 FIBA Under-19 World Cup in Latvia. He averaged 9.1 points, 3.9 assists and 3.3 rebounds per game, helping his team win the gold medal.

Career statistics

College

|-
| style="text-align:left;"| 2020–21
| style="text-align:left;"| TCU
| 25 || 21 || 32.9 || .413 || .360 || .827 || 3.5 || 3.1 || 1.0 || .2 || 13.6
|-
| style="text-align:left;"| 2021–22
| style="text-align:left;"| TCU
| 31 || 31 || 33.4 || .382 || .295 || .759 || 3.5 || 3.8 || 1.2 || .2 || 15.4
|- class="sortbottom"
| style="text-align:center;" colspan="2"| Career
| 56 || 52 || 33.2 || .394 || .323 || .782 || 3.5 || 3.5 || 1.1 || .2 || 14.6

References

External links
TCU Horned Frogs bio
USA Basketball bio

2002 births
Living people
American men's basketball players
Basketball players from Texas
People from Lancaster, Texas
Point guards
Sportspeople from the Dallas–Fort Worth metroplex
TCU Horned Frogs men's basketball players